Laban ng Masa (LnM) is a major left-wing electoral coalition of democratic socialist and progressive groups in the Philippines.

Being democratic socialist, LnM participates in the political processes of the state, insisting on elections as a legitimate and viable means of achieving socialism. It opposes taking the extralegal route preferred and deemed necessary by Marxist–Leninist–Maoists. The coalition positions itself firmly against authoritarianism and elitism.

The coalition endorsed Leody de Guzman and Walden Bello in the 2022 presidential and vice-presidential elections.

Coalition members 

 Alab Katipunan
 Anihan ng Manggagawa sa Agrikultura
 Bangsa
 Bukluran ng Manggagawang Pilipino (BMP)
 KAISA-UP
 Katarungan
 Kongreso ng Pagkakaisang Maralitang Lungsod (KPML)
 Metro East Labour Federation (MELF)
 Metro Manila Vendors' Alliance (MMVA)
 Oriang
 Pagkakaisa ng Manggagawa sa Transportasyon
 Partido Lakas ng Masa
 Pwersa LGBTQ
 Pwersa Riders Club 4
 Pwersa Women
 Pwersa Youth
 Rights
 Samahan ng Progresibong Kabataan (SPARK)
 Sanlakas
 Solidarity of Unions in the Philippines for Empowerment and Reform (SUPER)
 Teachers' Dignity Coalition
 Zone One Tondo Organisation

References 

Left-wing parties in the Philippines
Political party alliances in the Philippines
Left-wing political party alliances
Socialist parties in the Philippines